Prevost Manor House, also known as Hush-Hush Farm, is a historic home located at Greenville in Greene County, New York.  It was built in 1793–1794 and has a -story central block with a -story east wing and single-story rear wings.

It was listed on the National Register of Historic Places in 1972.

References

Houses on the National Register of Historic Places in New York (state)
Houses completed in 1794
Houses in Greene County, New York
National Register of Historic Places in Greene County, New York
1794 establishments in New York (state)